The 1978 Denver Broncos season was the team's 19th year in professional football and its ninth with the National Football League (NFL). Led by second-year head coach Red Miller, the Broncos were 10–6, repeated as champions of the AFC West, and made the playoffs for the second straight season.

In the AFC divisional round, Denver lost on the road to the top-seeded Pittsburgh Steelers, whom they had lost to two weeks earlier in the regular season finale at Mile High Stadium; the Broncos had clinched their division title six days earlier with a win over struggling Kansas City, while runners-up Oakland and Seattle both lost and fell to 8–7 with San Diego, two games back with one to play. Pittsburgh went on to win Super Bowl XIII.

Denver was fifteenth in the league in scoring offense, while the Broncos' defense finished second in points allowed and sixth in yards allowed.

Offseason

NFL Draft

Personnel

Staff

Roster

Regular season

Schedule

 Monday night (September 11, October 16), Thursday (November 23: Thanksgiving), Saturday (December 16)
This was the first NFL regular season with 16 games.

Standings

Playoffs

References

External links
Denver Broncos – 1978 media guide
1978 Denver Broncos at Pro-Football-Reference.com

Denver Broncos
Denver Broncos seasons
AFC West championship seasons
1978 in sports in Colorado